is a Japanese light novel series written by Kōhei Azano and illustrated by Sumihei. It was adapted into a manga series in 2010. It received an anime series on October 9, 2013 and ended on March 26, 2014. Funimation simulcasted the series on their website.

Plot

Onmyodou magic was a powerful technique which was used by the Japanese during World War I. Later, infamous Yakou Tsuchimikado performed a ritual known as the 'Taizan Fukun Ritual', which will eventually bring out Japan as a formidable force. However, the ritual goes horribly wrong and the result of this becomes what is now known as the "Great Spiritual Disaster", an incident which haunts the entire Japanese continent to date. In addition to this, the Onmyo Agency was established to monitor supernatural activity in the area and to combat any spirits or demons that would make their way into the real world.

In the present day, onmyodou has become more refined, simplified and modernised, even finding its use in the fields of medicine and technology. But not everyone is capable of affording this power, as can be seen in the case of Harutora, a member of one of the Tsuchimikado's branch families, who was born with no spiritual power. Despite being born to a distinguished onmyoji family, his life has become meaningless as he can accomplish nothing without any spiritual power. But he does remember the fact about him making a promise with his engaged childhood friend Natsume, the Tsuchimikado's family heir and Yakou's supposed reincarnation. Despite his background, living a normal and peaceful life is all Harutora ever wanted. But when a group of people from the Onmyo Agency attempt to recreate the same tragedy that led to Japan's downfall two years ago, he decides to take matters into his own hands by fighting alongside Natsume as her shikigami (supporter).

Media

Light novels
Tokyo Ravens began as a series of light novels by Kōhei Azano, author of Black Blood Brothers, with illustrations by Sumihei; 16 volumes have been released as of October 2018. The first volume of a side-story series titled Tokyo Ravens EX was published on July 20, 2013; four volumes have been released as of October 2016.

Volume list

Manga
Tokyo Ravens inspired the creation of six manga series based on the light novels. The first one, Tokyo Ravens, was illustrated by Atsushi Suzumi. It was serialsed from April 26, 2010 to July 26, 2017 in Monthly Shōnen Ace. The chapters have been collected into fiveteen  volumes. It follows the main story of the light novels. In 2014 and 2015 , Kadokawa published eleven English volumes of the manga adaptation on BookWalker, their official eBook store.
The second manga series, Tokyo Ravens: Tokyo Fox was illustrated by COMTA and published in Fujimi Shobo's Age premium in 2011. It features an original story focused on Kon. 
The third series, Tokyo Ravens: Red and White, is a manga spinoff by Azumi Mochizuki. It was serialized in Kadokawa's Monthly Dragon Age and concluded in the November 2013 issue.
The fourth series, Tokyo Ravens: Sword of Song, is a manga spinoff by Ran Kuze. Its serialization began in the November 2013 issue of Kodansha's Monthly Shōnen Rival.
The fifth series, Tokyo Ravens -Girls Photograph-, started serialization in Kadokawa's Monthly Dragon Age in the January 2014 issue. It focuses on the female characters of the series.
The sixth and the latest series, Tokyo Ravens AnotherXHoliday started in Kadokawa's shojo magazine Millefeui in the February 2014 issue. It focuses on the male characters of the series.

Anime
An anime adaption aired in Japan from October 6, 2013 to March 26, 2014, animated by Eight Bit, directed by Takaomi Kansaki, and with screenplay by Hideyuki Kurata. Funimation has licensed the series for English release. Medialink licensed the series in Asia-Pacific. The second opening theme is "Outgrow" by Gero and the second ending theme is "Break a spell" by Mami Kawada.

Episode list

Reception
In Anime News Network's Fall 2013 Anime Preview Guide, reviewers Rebecca Silverman and Theron Martin gave the series an initial rating of 2 out of 5 stars, while reviewers Carlo Santos and Carl Kimlinger gave the series an initial rating of 2.5 out of 5 stars. Martin commented that "the artistic effort is wholly unimpressive beyond the yukata that Hokuto wears and the CG creations stand out too starkly against the regular animation. Director Takaomki Kanasaki is quite capable of producing fun, stylish fare (as he proved with Is This a Zombie?), but this definitely does not qualify. Only some decent early character development saves this one from the garbage pile," while Santos gave a slightly more positive review, stating that "Tokyo Ravens is nothing special, but it isn't horrible, either. This supernatural adventure series employs all the usual trappings of the genre, but does so without making a mess of the story or throwing too many ideas in. In fact, it even spends a good amount of time on the characters' day-to-day lives, instead of rushing them into the action." Silverman praised the series' art and character designs, as well as the series' use of both 2D and 3D CGI graphics, but concludes that "right now it feels like a hodgepodge of ideas that hasn't quite gotten itself grounded yet," while Kimlinger criticized the series' poor start and use of clichés, stating that "watching Tokyo Ravens is probably the closest you'll get to experiencing precognition. In a show that gets the desired effect from its tropes, that wouldn't be a problem. But Ravens only does its tropes half-right."

China ban
On June 12, 2015, the Chinese Ministry of Culture listed Tokyo Ravens among 38 anime and manga titles banned in China.

References

External links
 Official Novel Website 
 Official Anime Website 
 Tokyo Ravens  at Fujimi Shobo 
 

Eight Bit (studio)
2010 Japanese novels
2010 manga
2013 anime television series debuts
Action anime and manga
Anime and manga based on light novels
Tokyo MX original programming
Fujimi Fantasia Bunko
Funimation
Medialink
Kadokawa Shoten manga
Kadokawa Dwango franchises
Fictional ravens
Light novels
NBCUniversal Entertainment Japan
Shōnen manga
Supernatural anime and manga
Yen Press titles
Censored television series
Works banned in China
Television censorship in China